Wolfgang Kaiser may refer to:

 Wolfgang Kaiser (KgU) (1924–1952), member of Rainer Hildebrandt's "Struggle against Inhumanity" group KgU 
 Wolfgang Kaiser (physicist) (born 1925), German physicist